Schwetzingen Palace is a schloss in the German state of Baden-Württemberg. Schwetzingen was the summer residence of the Electors Palatine Charles III Philip and Charles IV Theodore (of the House of Wittelsbach). It is situated in Schwetzingen, roughly equidistant from the electors' seats at Heidelberg and Mannheim, and is most notable for its spacious and ornate gardens. Other than these exceptionally well preserved gardens and the palace proper, the compound also features the Schlosstheater Schwetzingen, the principal venue for the annual Schwetzingen Festival.

The palace

The main building replaces a 17th-century hunting lodge built on the foundations of an older moated castle of which it also retains some foundations and walling (hence the slightly irregular layout). It was built in its current form in several building campaigns between 1700 and 1750, in part to plans of the Heidelberg architect, Johann Adam Breunig. Construction began in the reign of Johann Wilhelm von der Pfalz, for whom the palace was not yet to be an official summer residence, but a simple hunting lodge. However, an ornate, if comparatively modestly scaled first garden was laid out at the same time, which was retained and embellished by Karl Philip. When the new, greatly expanded gardens of Charles Theodore began to take shape in the 1750s and 60s, plans were commissioned from the court architect, Nicolas de Pigage, for a new palace that would have been of a scale on a par with its surroundings. However, mostly due to concurrent projects that siphoned off funds (the completion of the gigantic new residential palace at Mannheim and the reconstruction of Schloss Benrath), nothing came of these plans. As a result, the modest building as it stands today is completely overwhelmed by the garden's sheer size and magnificence. It would, therefore, be more appropriate to call it "the gardens and palace of Schwetzingen", and not the reverse.

Much of the original interior decoration and furnishings survive. Following a major restoration effort in the late 20th century, several of the electoral and ducal apartments are now back in the state their previous occupants would have known. These rooms may not have the supreme splendour found elsewhere in German princely dwellings, but they do convey a particularly vivid image of the court's everyday life. The building was too small to also accommodate the reception rooms required for the gatherings of the court. These – comprising two large halls and the theater- were instead incorporated into the two symmetrical curved outbuildings (the Zirkelbauten) on the garden front, initially intended to serve only as orangeries.

The gardens

During the second half of the 18th century, when the current Schwetzingen garden was created, the "French" formal garden was gradually being supplanted by the "English" landscape garden as the prevalent style of gardening. The numerous princely estates in the Holy Roman Empire were quick to pick up the change, often remodelling older gardens according to the new taste. The Schwetzingen garden perhaps uniquely reflects this fundamental change in attitude, as its creators actually sought to reconcile the two conflicting styles. Accordingly, while the oldest portions are strictly formal, the newer ones subsequently introduced more "natural" features. However, great care was taken so that the finished work would still form a coherent whole. As a result, Schwetzingen is sometimes described as the principal surviving example of an intermediary style, the "anglo-chinese" garden, but in its diversity actually transcends the boundaries of that particular – and short-lived – style.

The first plan, devised by the gardener Petrie of Zweibrücken, introduced one highly unusual motive, namely the layout of the main parterre as a full circle. This remains unchanged and is a prominent feature that distinguishes Schwetzingen from most contemporary creations. Other than that, the first design was fairly conventional, even somewhat antiquated, in character. It appears to have relied heavily on French theorist Dezallier d'Argenville's influential textbook Théorie et practique du jardinage, with a certain penchant for the less revolutionary solutions Dezallier d'Argenville proposed; as a case in point, the design of the parterre's broderie ("embroidery") plantings, pretty though it is, looks rather timid when compared to some of d'Argenville's bolder suggestions.

Under the auspices of Nicolas de Pigage, the garden's plan was thoroughly updated and substantially expanded, all the while preserving most of its original features. Unlike his predecessor, Pigage was familiar with the latest developments in style. Most of the designs he prepared for Schwetzingen, spanning a period of more than twenty years, have to be considered progressive and up-to-date. However, not all of them were carried out, and as time progressed, the prince's (and possibly also the architect's) reluctance to make a full switch towards the "English" style also provoked critical scorn (most notably from the garden-design theorist Christian Cay Lorenz Hirschfeld). Exempt from Hirschfeld's criticism were only the numerous fabriques that Pigage built in various parts of the garden. The outstanding architectural quality of these small, yet elaborate, buildings was universally acknowledged (Hirschfeld, in fact, objected mostly to their number – he would have preferred fewer of them). On the newer, more fully developed landscaped portions, Pigage collaborated closely with the up-and-coming garden designer Friedrich Ludwig von Sckell.

The sculpture throughout the garden is of varied quality, with a few mediocre decorative pieces, salvaged from the earlier garden and various other locations, as well as some impressive works by Gabriël Grupello and Peter Anton von Verschaffelt, among others. One sculpture in particular, a depiction of Pan sitting atop a cliff and playing his flute, was very highly regarded in its time. It is a work by the Mannheim sculptor, Peter Simon Lamine. A similar statue, by the same master, was unveiled some twenty years later at Nymphenburg Palace. Most of the sculpture within the parterre, and some of the works scattered elsewhere, was acquired at auction in the 1760s. Most of it is the work of then-celebrated French artist Barthélemy Guibal and had previously adorned the Lunéville palace of the deposed Polish king Stanisław Leszczyński. The majority of the sculpture is now replaced with modern replicas to avoid further degradation. The originals are on display within the premises themselves, in the "new orangery" building.

The theatre
Much like the gardens, the theatre is in many ways a synthesis of conflicting styles. Originally built in 1753, to the plans of Nicolas de Pigage (1723–1796) and in a very short time, it could be considered a pure rococo creation. In the course of a later refurbishment, this was blended with early neoclassical tendencies. In its first state, the theatre, following the example of French court theatres of the time, did not have boxes (these were a staple of "Italian" theatres). In order to enlarge it, the auditorium's back wall was then pierced with a row of arcades, thus creating a more "box-like" impression. As a result, the theatre can, at least visually, also be considered a combination of the customary "French" and "Italian" layouts, even if the adjustment was, in this case, made mostly for practical reasons. As with the garden, the overall effect is very homogeneous as well as esthetically pleasing. Well into the 20th century, the theatre had preserved its original stage machinery. This was then lost and replaced with modern facilities, first in the 1950s, and again in the 1970s, when the backstage area was also expanded.

The mosque

The mosque (German: Moschee) in the gardens complex is the earliest mosque-style building in Germany. It was built in 1779–1791 by a French architect for the Prince Elector of the Palatinate. Built at a time when the "Turkish" style was fashionable in Germany, it was never intended for prayer but later served religious purposes at various times.

After many years of restoration, and at great expense, the mosque is fully restored and open to the public.

Notes

References

External links

Information about and photos of the theatre

Electoral Palatinate
Gardens in Baden-Württemberg
Historic house museums in Baden-Württemberg